21st CDG Awards
February 19, 2019

Contemporary: 
Crazy Rich Asians

Period: 
The Favourite

Sci-Fi/Fantasy: 
Black Panther
The 21st Costume Designers Guild Awards, honoring the best costume designs in film and television for 2018, took place on February 19, 2019. The nominees were announced on January 9, 2019.

Winners and nominees

Film

Excellence in Contemporary Film
 Crazy Rich Asians — Mary E. Vogt
 Mamma Mia! Here We Go Again — Michele Clapton
 Ocean's 8 — Sarah Edwards
 Red Sparrow — Trish Summerville
 A Star Is Born — Erin Benach
 Widows — Jenny Eagan

Excellence in Period Film
 The Favourite — Sandy Powell BlacKkKlansman — Marci Rodgers
 Bohemian Rhapsody — Julian Day
 Mary Poppins Returns — Sandy Powell
 Mary Queen of Scots — Alexandra Byrne

Excellence in Sci-Fi/Fantasy Film
 Black Panther — Ruth E. Carter Aquaman — Kym Barrett
 Avengers: Infinity War — Judianna Makovsky
 The Nutcracker and the Four Realms — Jenny Beavan
 A Wrinkle in Time — Paco Delgado

Television

Excellence in Contemporary Television
 The Assassination of Gianni Versace: American Crime Story — Lou Eyrich and Allison Leach Grace and Frankie — Allyson B. Fanger
 The Romanoffs — Janie Bryant and Wendy Chuck
 Sharp Objects — Alix Friedberg
 This Is Us — Hala Bahmet

Excellence in Period Television
 The Marvelous Mrs. Maisel — Donna Zakowska The Alienist — Michael Kaplan
 GLOW — Beth Morgan
 The Man in the High Castle — Catherine Adair
 Outlander — Nina Ayres and Terry Dresbach

Excellence in Sci-Fi/Fantasy Television
 Westworld — Sharen Davis American Horror Story: Apocalypse — Paula Bradley and Lou Eyrich
 The Handmaid's Tale — Ane Crabtree
 A Series of Unfortunate Events — Cynthia Summers
 Star Trek: Discovery — Gersha Phillips

Excellence in Variety, Reality-Competition, Live Television
 RuPaul's Drag Race'' — Zaldy
 Jesus Christ Superstar Live in Concert — Paul Tazewell
 The Late Late Show with James Corden — Lauren Shapiro
 Saturday Night Live — Tom Broecker and Eric Justian
 So You Think You Can Dance'' — Marina Toybina

Short Form

Excellence in Short Film Design
 Childish Gambino: "This Is America" music video — Natasha Newman-Thomas
 Adidas: "See My Creativity" commercial — Bonnie Stauch
 Elton John: "Farewell Yellow Brick Road: The Legacy" short film — Charlie Altuna
 Justin Timberlake: "Supplies" music video — Ami Goodheart
 Nespresso: "The Quest" commercial — Jenny Eagan
 Star Trek: Short Treks: “The Brightest Star” - Gersha Phillips

Career Achievement Award
Ruth E. Carter

Spotlight Award
Glenn Close

Distinguished Collaborator Award
Ryan Murphy

Distinguished Service Award
Betty Pecha Madden

References

Costume Designers Guild Awards
2019 film awards
2019 television awards
2018 guild awards
2018 in fashion
2018 in American cinema
2018 in American television